The 2019–20 season was the 74th season in HNK Rijeka’s history. It was their 29th successive season in the Croatian First Football League, and 46th successive top tier season.

Competitions

Overall

Last updated: 1 August 2020.

HT Prva liga

Classification

Results summary

Results by round

Results by opponent

Source: 2019–20 Croatian First Football League article

Matches

HT Prva liga

Source: Croatian Football Federation

Croatian Cup

Source: Croatian Football Federation

UEFA Europa League

Source: uefa.com

Croatian Super Cup

Friendlies

Pre-season

On-season (2019)

Mid-season

On-season (2020)

Player seasonal records
Updated 1 August 2020. Competitive matches only.

Goals

Source: Competitive matches

Clean sheets

Source: Competitive matches

Disciplinary record

Source: nk-rijeka.hr

Appearances and goals

Source: nk-rijeka.hr

Suspensions

Penalties

Overview of statistics

Transfers

In

Source: Glasilo Hrvatskog nogometnog saveza

Out

Source: Glasilo Hrvatskog nogometnog saveza

Spending:  €850,000
Income:  €3,900,000
Expenditure:  €3,050,000

Notes

References

2019-20
Croatian football clubs 2019–20 season
2019–20 UEFA Europa League participants seasons